"Weave Your Spell" is a single by the British group Level 42, that was released in 1982.

It was the second single to be released from the album, The Pursuit of Accidents and reached #43 in the UK charts in August 1982. The song features a lead vocal from keyboardist, Mike Lindup.

Charts

Personnel
Mike Lindup - keyboards and lead vocals
Mark King - bass and vocals
Boon Gould - guitars
Phil Gould - drums and vocals
Wally Badarou - keyboards

References

1982 singles
Level 42 songs
Songs written by Mike Lindup
Songs written by Mark King (musician)
Songs written by Phil Gould (musician)
1982 songs
Polydor Records singles
Song recordings produced by Mike Vernon (record producer)